Graham Norman Deuble (born 24 December 1943) is an Australian diver. He competed in the men's 3 metre springboard event at the 1960 Summer Olympics.

References

External links
 
 

1943 births
Living people
Australian male divers
Olympic divers of Australia
Divers at the 1960 Summer Olympics
People from Warwick, Queensland
Commonwealth Games medallists in diving
Commonwealth Games silver medallists for Australia
Divers at the 1962 British Empire and Commonwealth Games
20th-century Australian people
21st-century Australian people
Medallists at the 1962 British Empire and Commonwealth Games